Sibley, Lindsay & Curr Company, known informally as Sibley's, was a Rochester, New York-based department store chain with stores located exclusively in the state of New York. Its flagship store, at 228 East Main Street in downtown Rochester, also housed its headquarters and featured an elegant executive dining room on the top floor.

History

The Department Store Years
Rufus Sibley, Alexander Lindsay, and John Curr were employees at the Hogg, Brown & Taylor dry-goods store in Boston.  Wishing to go into business for themselves, they investigated potential sites and settled on the growing city of Rochester.  Their first storefront, often called "the Boston store" by locals, opened in 1868.  When the company opened a new 12-story,  flagship store in the Granite Building, it was among the five largest department stores in the country at the time.

In 1905, after the disastrous 1904 "Sibley fire" gutted the Granite Building and much of Rochester's dry goods district, Sibley's moved to its final location, the Sibley Building at the northeast corner of East Main Street and Clinton Avenue.  By 1939, Sibley's was the largest department store between New York City and Chicago.

In 1962, competitors B. Forman Co. and McCurdy's collaborated to construct Midtown Plaza, right across Main Street from Sibley's.  Sibley's was connected to the new mall by an enclosed third-floor walkway, part of the Rochester Skyway system.

The company was acquired by the Associated Dry Goods Corporation in 1957, which, in turn, was acquired by May Department Stores in 1986. The Sibley's name was merged into May Company's Kaufmann's name in 1990. Most of its suburban locations, after converting to Kaufmann's, became part of Macy's by 2006.

Monroe Community College - Damon City Campus calls Sibley Building Home 
In 1991 the State University of New York's Monroe Community College, also known as MCC, opened its second campus at the Sibley Building.  The downtown campus continued to operate here until the completion of a new downtown campus in 2017, which is now located at nearby Kodak Tower, the headquarters of the Kodak Company.

Today - Sibley Square 
Now under a new name, Sibley Square, the iconic Sibley Building is undergoing a major overhaul, transforming the historic site into a combination of retail, commercial (offices), and upscale residential units.  The renovations seek to combine the historic treasure of this architectural space while also creating a sleek, modern atmosphere for today's standards.

Developer 
The current Sibley Square project is being developed by WinnCompanies, a Boston, Massachusetts-based award winning development firm.  WinnCompanies was founded in 1971 by Arthur Winn.

Address Change 
The current address of Sibley Square is:

250 East Main Street

Rochester, NY 14604

References

External links
DeadMalls.com
Sibley Square Official Website
Winn Companies

Defunct department stores based in New York State
Retail companies established in 1868
Retail companies disestablished in 1990
Companies based in Rochester, New York
Defunct companies based in New York (state)
1868 establishments in New York (state)